The 1892 United States presidential election in Texas took place on November 8, 1892. All contemporary 44 states were part of the 1892 United States presidential election. Texas voters chose 15 electors to the Electoral College, which selected the president and vice president.

Texas was won by the Democratic nominees, Grover Cleveland of New York and his running mate Adlai Stevenson I of Illinois.

Although Harrison received less than 20% of the statewide vote, as of the 2020 presidential election, this is the last time Starr County has voted for a Republican presidential candidate, the longest unbroken Democratic voting streak in the country.

Results

See also
 United States presidential elections in Texas

Notes

References

Texas
1892
1892 Texas elections